Louis Judson Swinburne (August 24, 1855- December 9, 1887) was an American author

Swinburne, the son of the Hon. John Swinburne, M.D., and Harriet (Judson) Swinburne, was born in Albany, New York., August 24, 1855. In 1870 he went abroad with his family, and passed through many  experiences with his father, who was in charge of the camp hospital service attached to the French army about Paris.  He printed for private circulation in 1875 a volume entitled Paris Sketches, narrating the incidents of his life during the Siege of Paris. In 1872 he returned to Albany, where he completed his preparation for Yale College in 1874.

He was seriously hindered by ill-health during his last year at Yale, and after graduating in 1879, in late 1880 he went West in search of health. He remained for the rest of his life (with the exception of a few brief visits to the east) in Colorado, where he died, of hemorrhage of the lungs, at Colorado Springs, December 9, 1887, in his 33rd year. He was not married.

He had devoted himself since graduation to literary pursuits, and had contributed numerous papers to the reviews. He had also rewritten his Paris Sketches, and had completed for early publication a volume of essays and an important work on English Romanticism.

External links 
 
 Paris Sketches
 Rossetti and the Pre-Raphaelites

1855 births
1887 deaths
American male writers
Writers from Albany, New York
Yale College alumni